Unexpected Guests is a compilation album by British-American rapper/producer MF Doom, released under the shortened pseudonym DOOM. The album is made up of a collection of songs performed by, produced by or featuring DOOM and previously released at various points throughout his career. It was released via Gold Dust Media in 2009.

Critical reception
At Metacritic, which assigns a weighted average score out of 100 to reviews from mainstream critics, Unexpected Guests received an average score of 65% based on 7 reviews, indicating "generally favorable reviews".

Track listing

References

External links
 

2009 compilation albums
Hip hop compilation albums
Collaborative albums
MF Doom albums
Albums produced by J Dilla